UAB Lelija is the biggest garment manufacturer in Lithuania, producing annually around 1.5 million outerwear textile clothing. "Lelija" was established in 1947. 414 employees currently work with the company.

Main enterprise is located in Paneriai (Vilnius), the capital of Lithuania, where are samples making, CAD (designing), CAM (cutting) departments and nine  specialized sewing workshops. The Company has six affiliates in other cities in Lithuania. In 2011, it owed 832,500 litas (241,000 euros) to the state alone.

References

External links
UAB Lelija

Companies based in Vilnius
Clothing companies established in 1947
Lithuanian brands
Clothing companies of Lithuania
1947 establishments in Lithuania
Paneriai
Manufacturing companies of the Soviet Union